This article lists important figures and events in Malaysian public affairs during the year 1994, together with births and deaths of notable Malaysians.

Incumbent political figures

Federal level
Yang di-Pertuan Agong: 
Sultan Azlan Shah (until 25 April)
Tuanku Jaafar (from 26 April)
Raja Permaisuri Agong: 
Tuanku Bainun (until 25 April)
Tuanku Najihah (from 26 April)
Prime Minister: Dato' Sri Dr Mahathir Mohamad
Deputy Prime Minister: Dato' Sri Anwar Ibrahim
Chief Justice: Abdul Hamid Omar then Eusoff Chin

State level
 Sultan of Johor: Sultan Iskandar
 Sultan of Kedah: Sultan Abdul Halim Muadzam Shah
 Sultan of Kelantan: Sultan Ismail Petra
 Raja of Perlis: Tuanku Syed Putra
 Sultan of Perak: Raja Nazrin Shah (Regent until 25 April)
 Sultan of Pahang: Sultan Ahmad Shah
 Sultan of Selangor: Sultan Salahuddin Abdul Aziz Shah (Deputy Yang Dipertuan Agong)
 Sultan of Terengganu: Sultan Mahmud Al-Muktafi Billah Shah
 Yang di-Pertuan Besar of Negeri Sembilan: Tunku Naquiyuddin (Regent)
 Yang di-Pertua Negeri (Governor) of Penang: Tun Dr Hamdan Sheikh Tahir
 Yang di-Pertua Negeri (Governor) of Malacca: Tun Syed Ahmad Al-Haj bin Syed Mahmud Shahabuddin
 Yang di-Pertua Negeri (Governor) of Sarawak: Tun Ahmad Zaidi Adruce Mohammed Noor
 Yang di-Pertua Negeri (Governor) of Sabah: Tun Said Keruak

Events
1 January – Visit Malaysia Year 1994 officially began.
1 January – Johor Bahru granted city status.
15 January – Tun Mohamad Haniff Omar retired, after 20 years as the Inspector General of Police.
January – Construction of the Bakun Dam in Sarawak commenced.
February – Proton Saga Iswara cars are used as taxicabs in Kuala Lumpur, replacing Isuzu taxicabs.
7 February – The Planetarium Negara (National Planetarium) in Kuala Lumpur officially opened.
1 March - RTM TV1 and TV3 began its full daytime broadcasts while TV Pendidikan began broadcasting exclusively on RTM TV2.
8–10 April – 1994 Malaysian motorcycle Grand Prix
26 April – Tuanku Jaafar of Negeri Sembilan elected as the Yang di-Pertuan Agong.
May – The Perodua Kancil, Malaysia's first compact car launched.
13 May – Two Malaysian peacekeeper Major Ariffin Zakaria and Major Ramli Shaari were killed in action (KIA) in the former Yugoslavia.
1 June - TV3 celebrates its tenth anniversary.
19 June - TV3 revamp the channel for a new look.
 Berita TV3/TV3 News revamp the channel for a new look.
 The 7 O'Clock News was renamed "TV3 Evening News" and became a late news bulletin on TV3; aired daily at 22:30 MST.
June – The piling work for the Petronas Twin Towers was completed.
16 July – The Shah Alam Stadium, the biggest stadium in Malaysia, was officially opened by Sultan Salahuddin Abdul Aziz Shah of Selangor.
31 August - biggest heist in Malaysia prepared by Mamak Gang at the Subang International Airport
September – The Rakan Muda youth program launched.
8 September – All sections of North–South Expressway were opened to traffic.
21 October – The Al-Arqam Islamic religious movement was banned by the federal government. More than five Al-Arqam members including Ashaari Mohammad (leader of movement) were arrested under Internal Security Act (ISA) in the main camp at Kampung Sungai Penchala, Kuala Lumpur. 
November – Puspakom, Malaysia's first computerized vehicle test centre, was introduced.
10 November – The Tunku Abdul Rahman Memorial was officially opened.
24 November – Proton Satria, Malaysia's hatchback car, launched.
December – Internet was introduced to Malaysia for the first time.

Births
 8 March – Nurul Elfira Loy – Actress
 10 March – Raja Ahmad Nazim Azlan Shah – Raja Kecil Negeri Perak
 4 April – Azroy Hazalwafie – Weightlifter 
 3 May – Farah Ann Abdul Hadi – Gymnast
 5 May – Hafizh Syahrin – Motorcycle racer
 4 June – Aznil Bidin – Weightlifter 
 11 June – Mohd Ridzuan Abdunloh – Footballer
 2 July – Muhammad Hadin Azman – Footballer
 30 July – Nelydia Senrose – Actress
 30 September – Nik Adruce – Actor
 7 October – Muhammad Syazwan Tajuddin – Footballer
 13 November - Hafidz Roshdi – Actor
 13 November – Lim Yin Fun – Badminton player
 28 November – Faizat Ghazli – Footballer

Deaths
31 January – Zain Mahmood – Author and screenwriter of Malay film Fenomena
11 September – Tan Sri Mubin Sheppard – Malaysian culture and heritage historian

See also
 1994 
 1993 in Malaysia | 1995 in Malaysia
 History of Malaysia

 
Years of the 20th century in Malaysia
Malaysia
Malaysia
1990s in Malaysia